The Campanian Archipelago, also called Neapolitan Archipelago, is an archipelago in the Tyrrhenian Sea, in southwestern Italy. It principally comprises 5 islands: Capri, Ischia, Nisida, Procida, and Vivara. Most of the archipelago belongs to the Metropolitan City of Naples (and previously part of the Province of Naples).

Extent 

The five principal islands are all administered by the Metropolitan City of Naples:
 Capri and 
 the 4 Phlegraean Islands:
 Ischia & its companion islet, the Aragonese Castle
 Nisida, 
 Procida, and
 Vivara.

Nearby islets and skerries are usually included in the archipelago as well: 
 Aragonese Castle
 the Sirenuse (the ) & the nearby .
 Gaiola Island
 ,  
 ,  
 the Capri faraglioni,  
 , 
 .
Most of these minor islets belong to Naples as well, except the Sirenuse (Galli), which belong to the Province of Salerno.

History 
The ancient name of this archipelago was the Parthenopaean Islands (from Parthenope, the ancient name of Naples). It originally included the Pontine Islands, which are now considered an archipelago in its own right.

, home to Castel dell'Ovo, used to be an island – albeit very near the coastline – in this archipelago. However, it is now a peninsula attached directly to the mainland.

Gallery

External links

Archipelagoes of Italy
Archipelagoes of the Mediterranean Sea
Campanian volcanic arc
Islands of Campania
Phlegraean Fields